Brière Regional Natural Park (French: Parc naturel régional de Brière) is a protected area in the Pays de la Loire region of France. The area was officially designated as a regional natural park in 1970.

The park includes the following member communes:

Assérac
Crossac
Donges
Guerande
Herbignac
La Baule-Escoublac
La Chapelle-des-Marais
Missillac
Montoir-de-Bretagne
Pornichet
Prinquiau
Saint-André-des-Eaux
Saint-Joachim
Saint-Lyphard
Saint-Malo-de-Guersac
Saint-Molf
Saint-Nazaire
Sainte-Reine-de-Bretagne
Trignac

See also
 List of regional natural parks of France

References

External links
 Official park website 
 Official park website 

Regional natural parks of France
Geography of Loire-Atlantique
Protected areas established in 1970
Tourist attractions in Pays de la Loire
Tourist attractions in Loire-Atlantique
Ramsar sites in Metropolitan France